Aleksandr Kuschynski (born October 27, 1979) is a Belarusian former professional road bicycle racer, who rode professionally between 2004 and 2015 for the , , ,  and  teams. Kuschynski was a three-time winner of the Belarusian National Road Race Championships. Kuschynski now works as a directeur sportif for both the men's and women's Minsk Cycling Club teams.

Major results

1997
 1st Overall La Coupe du Président de la Ville de Grudziądz
2000
 2nd Road race, National Road Championships
 5th Gran Premio della Liberazione
2001
 3rd Time trial, National Road Championships
 8th Gran Premio della Liberazione
 9th Giro del Belvedere
2002
 3rd Time trial, National Road Championships
2003
 1st Gran Premio San Giuseppe
2004
 1st Châteauroux Classic
 1st Giro d'Abruzzo
 2nd Overall Tour of Slovenia
1st Stage 1
 4th Tour du Finistère
 6th Trofeo Città di Castelfidardo
 7th Giro d'Oro
2005
 1st  Road race, National Road Championships
 1st Overall Boucles de la Mayenne
 4th Gran Premio Industria e Commercio Artigianato Carnaghese
 9th Overall Settimana Ciclistica Lombarda
 10th E.O.S. Tallinn GP
2006
 1st Memorial Oleg Dyachenko
 National Road Championships
2nd Road race
2nd Time trial
 2nd Overall Settimana Ciclistica Lombarda
 3rd Overall Five Rings of Moscow
 3rd Gran Premio di Lugano
 6th Grand Prix of Aargau Canton
2007
 1st Overall Five Rings of Moscow
1st Stages 1, 2 & 4
 2nd Road race, National Road Championships
 5th Mayor Cup
 7th Tour du Haut Var
 10th Memorial Oleg Dyachenko
2008
 National Road Championships
2nd Road race
3rd Time trial
 5th Omloop Het Volk
2009
 2nd Road race, National Road Championships
 2nd Gent–Wevelgem
2010
 1st  Road race, National Road Championships
 5th Overall Giro della Provincia di Reggio Calabria
2011
 1st  Road race, National Road Championships
2012
 3rd Road race, National Road Championships
2013
 9th Rund um Köln
2014
 8th Tour of Almaty
2015
 3rd Road race, National Road Championships
 Race Horizon Park
3rd Classic
5th Race for Peace
 4th Sochi Cup
 4th Grand Prix of ISD
 5th Krasnodar–Anapa
 5th Grand Prix of Vinnytsia
 6th Overall Tour of Szeklerland
1st Points classification
1st Stage 1
 9th Grand Prix of Sochi Mayor
 10th Overall Five Rings of Moscow

Grand Tour general classification results timeline

References

External links

Profile on Katusha official website

1979 births
Living people
People from Orsha
Belarusian male cyclists
Cyclists at the 2008 Summer Olympics
Olympic cyclists of Belarus
Sportspeople from Vitebsk Region